Rabia Iqbal Khan professionally known by her stage name Kubra Khan (born 16 June 1993) is a British-Pakistani actress who works in Urdu television and films. She made her debut in 2014 with comedy-thriller film Na Maloom Afraad and later appeared in Hindi film Welcome 2 Karachi. Since she starred in Jawani Phir Nahi Ani 2 and Parwaaz Hai Junoon both (2018) and London Nahi Jaunga (2022).

Her television appearances includes Sang-e-Mar Mar (2016), Alif Allah Aur Insaan (2017),  Alif (2019), Hum Kahan Ke Sachay Thay and Sinf-e-Aahan both in (2021). Khan was last appeared in Hum TV's Sang-e-Mah  (2022).

Career
In 2013, she was cast in the role of Hina in the Pakistani film Na Maloom Afraad, a bank-worker and love interest of film's main lead Mohsin Abbas Haider. In 2015, Khan appeared in the Bollywood movie Welcome 2 Karachi. She made her television debut in Sang-e-Mar Mar which aired on Hum TV in 2016. She appeared in several other television series such as Alif Allah Aur Insaan and Daldal.

In 2018, she appeared in the Pakistani films Jawani Phir Nahi Ani 2 and Parwaaz Hai Junoon, both of which released on 22 August Eid-al-Adha. Khan will next feature opposite Humayun Saeed in Nadeem Baig's romantic-comedy film London Nahi Jaunga, slated to release on Eid ul Azha 2020.

Filmography

Films

Television

Telefilm

Music videos 
 Hamesha by Soch Band. (2013)
 Ki Kenda Dil by Rajveer (2013)

Other appearances

Awards and nominations

References

External links
 

Living people
1993 births
People from Multan
Pakistani film actresses
Pakistani television actresses
Pakistani female models
British film actresses
British television actresses
British female models
Pakistani emigrants to the United Kingdom
British people of Pakistani descent
British film actors of Pakistani descent
Actresses in Urdu cinema
Actresses in Hindi cinema
Pakistani expatriate actresses in India
British expatriate actresses in India
European actresses in India
21st-century Pakistani actresses
21st-century British actresses